Andrew Páez (born 28 December 1968) is a Venezuelan footballer. He played in six matches for the Venezuela national football team from 1996 to 1997. He was also part of Venezuela's squad for the 1997 Copa América tournament.

References

External links
 

1968 births
Living people
Venezuelan footballers
Venezuela international footballers
Association football midfielders
People from Mérida, Mérida